Poland participated in the 2010 Summer Youth Olympics in Singapore.

The Polish squad consisted of 43 athletes competing in 17 sports: aquatics (swimming), archery, athletics, boxing, canoeing, cycling, equestrian, fencing, gymnastics, judo, modern pentathlon, rowing, sailing, table tennis, taekwondo, weightlifting and wrestling.

Medalists

Archery

Boys

Girls

Mixed Team

Athletics

Boys
Track and Road Events

Field Events

Girls
Track and Road Events

Field Events

Boxing

Boys

Canoeing

Boys

Girls

Cycling

Cross Country

Time Trial

BMX

Road Race

Overall

 * Received -5 for finishing road race with all three racers

Equestrian

Fencing

Group Stage

Knock-Out Stage

Gymnastics

Artistic Gymnastics

Boys

Judo

Individual

Team

Modern pentathlon

Rowing

Sailing

One Person Dinghy

Windsurfing

Swimming

Table tennis

Individual

Team

Taekwondo

Weightlifting

Wrestling

Freestyle

References

External links
Competitors List: Poland

Nations at the 2010 Summer Youth Olympics
2010 in Polish sport
Poland at the Youth Olympics